During the 1997–98 English football season, Nottingham Forest F.C. competed in the Football League First Division.

Season summary
Nottingham Forest were re-promoted to the Premier League, much thanks to the striking partnership of Pierre van Hooijdonk and Kevin Campbell. In the end, Forest had a four-point margin down to the 3rd positioned-team Sunderland, prompting an immediate return to the top flight.

Final league table

Results
Nottingham Forest's score comes first

Legend

Football League First Division

FA Cup

League Cup

First-team squad
Squad at end of season

Left club permanently during season

Left club on loan during season

References

Nottingham Forest F.C. seasons
Nottingham Forest